Joe Dassin (commonly called La Fleur aux dents after the first track on side 1) is the fourth French studio album by Joe Dassin. It came out in 1970 on CBS Disques.

Commercial performance 
According to U.S. Billboard (its 1 May 1971 issue), the long play sold over 250,000 copies in three months.

The LP reached no. 1 in France (according to the chart, courtesy of the Centre d'Information et de Documentation du Disque, that U.S. Billboard published in its "Hits of the World" section).

Also, according to a survey published by the already mentioned U.S. Billboard in its 8 July 1972 issue and based on the charts compiled by the Centre d'Information et de Documentation du Disque, Joe Dassin became the top album artist of the whole year 1971 in France.

Track listing

References

External links 
 

1970 albums
Joe Dassin albums
CBS Disques albums

Albums produced by Jacques Plait